State Route 189 (SR 189) is a numbered state highway in Maine, running from U.S. Route 1 (US 1) in Whiting in the west to the Canada–US border at Lubec in the east. In Lubec the route crosses the Franklin Delano Roosevelt Bridge onto Campobello Island, New Brunswick.

Route description
SR 189 begins its eastward trek with its intersection with US 1 in Whiting. From the junction, the route generally follows a northeasterly course through Trescott Township (part of the East Central Washington unorganized territory) and West Lubec prior to reaching its eastern terminus at the Franklin Delano Roosevelt Bridge.  Via the bridge, SR 189 crosses Johnson Bay into New Brunswick and continues as New Brunswick Route 774.

Major junctions

References

External links

Maine State Route Log via floodgap.com

189
Transportation in Washington County, Maine